Donald Leroy Evans (July 5, 1957  – January 5, 1999) was an American serial killer who murdered at least three people from 1985 to 1991. He was known for confessing to killing victims at parks and rest areas across more than twenty U.S. states.

Crimes
Born in Michigan, Evans was convicted of his first crime in Galveston, Texas, for the rape of a local woman in 1986. He was sentenced to fifteen years in prison, but served only five. After his parole in 1991, he returned to Galveston and took work as a desk clerk in a motel, but was discharged after parole officials "objected to a convicted sex offender working in a motel setting."

Evans was arrested while he was employed aboard a fishing boat, for the murder of the 10-year-old girl that he had raped and kidnapped. He eventually faced a new arrest warrant when a former girlfriend filed a complaint to police about threats of violence. Evans stayed ahead of law enforcement officials briefly by stealing a car and fleeing to Mississippi. He tried to remain inconspicuous in the Gulfport area, but soon committed the crime for which he would receive the death penalty: the rape and murder of 10-year-old Beatrice Louise Routh on August 1, 1991.

Evans seized the homeless girl from a Gulfport park and sexually assaulted her, before strangling her to death and dumping her corpse in a rural area. At trial, the medical examiner testified that the girl "was conscious, and could feel pain" throughout her day-long ordeal. Arrested soon afterward, Evans confessed to abducting the girl, and he was remanded to a federal prison in Colorado on kidnapping charges. On August 16, 1993, a jury trial in Mississippi convicted Evans of sexual battery and murder; three days later, the same jury refused an option to grant him life imprisonment and sentenced him to the death penalty.

Incarceration and death
While in custody, Evans claimed responsibility for killing more than 70 other people in 22 states. Most of the murders and rapes were committed at rest stops and public parks. The authorities were originally skeptical of Evans's claims, but two of his descriptions were perfect matches to unsolved cases across Florida. In 1995, Evans pleaded guilty to the 1985 strangulation death of Ira Jean Smith in exchange for a life sentence.

He successfully escaped the Harrison County Jail in June 1993 but was recaptured a short time later, hiding in a shed. Evans was stabbed to death in 1999 by a fellow death row inmate at the Mississippi State Penitentiary while in the shower.

Known victims
 Ira Jean Smith (female, 38, March 7, 1985)
 Janet Movich (female, 38, April 14, 1985)
 Beatrice Louise Routh (female, 10, August 1, 1991)

See also 
 List of serial killers in the United States

References

External links
 "Serial Killers: Going for The Record". Time. August 26, 1991.
  FindLaw: "Donald Leroy Evans v. State of Mississippi" 
 "Killer Asks To Wear KKK Robes, Be Called 'Hi Hitler' At Trial". Sun-Sentinel. Fort Lauderdale, Florida. February 12, 1994.

1957 births
1985 murders in the United States
1991 murders in the United States
1999 deaths
1999 murders in the United States
20th-century American criminals
American escapees
American male criminals
American murderers of children
American people convicted of murder
American people convicted of rape
American people who died in prison custody
American serial killers
American rapists
Criminals from Michigan
Deaths by stabbing in Mississippi
Escapees from Mississippi detention
Male murder victims
Male serial killers
People convicted of murder by Florida
People convicted of murder by Mississippi
People convicted under the Federal Kidnapping Act
People convicted of murder by the United States federal government
Prisoners sentenced to life imprisonment by the United States federal government
People from Galveston, Texas
People murdered in Mississippi
Prisoners sentenced to life imprisonment by Florida
Prisoners sentenced to death by Mississippi
Prisoners who died in Mississippi detention
Serial killers murdered in prison custody
es:Donald Evans
nl:Donald Evans
sv:Donald Evans